Zoe Kristi Hardman (born 16 November 1982) is a British television presenter and actress. She first appeared on TV in Channel 4's reality game show Playing It Straight in 2005.

Career
Hardman was born in Kent, England. She was a presenter on ITV's phone-in quiz show Glitterball. She is heavily involved in the Entertainment and Fashion show weekly for the online entertainment syndication company ReelKandi TV. She also continues to do commercials, acting and voiceover work. In 2011, Zoe was the showbiz news reporter for an on-line channel (T5M) and also spent time filming at The Ashes (Cricket) tournament for the ECB. Hardman was one of the main presenters on the Nuts TV channel on Friday and Saturday nights.

In January 2012, she began hosting Take Me Out: The Gossip on ITV2 alongside Mark Wright, until the show was rested in 2014. She did not return to the show when it was revived in 2015. She also appeared as MC at the Boodles tennis tournament at Stoke Park in Buckinghamshire.

In June 2015, Zoe started hosting her own late night radio show across the Heart network from 10pm-1am. In August 2016, she moved from late-nights to Sunday afternoons on the station. In January 2020, Hardman became installed as the host of Heart Weekend Breakfast but was then moved to Saturday afternoons and Sunday mid-mornings following the departure of Sian Welby. She then was on between 6 - 9am Sat & 9am - 12pm Sun since 2023 she is only on Sundays 9am - 12pm.

She presents Made by Mammas: The Podcast alongside Georgia Dayton.

Personal life
On 25 April 2016, Hardman announced that she was expecting her first child with her rugby player boyfriend, Paul Doran-Jones. Their daughter, Luna, was born on 19 September 2016. A further son, Kit, was born on 28 April 2018.

She spoke about going through the menopause aged just 34.

Television credits
Joseph and the Amazing Technicolor Dreamcoat (1999)
Quiznation
Richard & Judy
Health & Beauty
The Big Gay Out
Music Zone Special
Playing It Straight (2005)
No Bananas (2005)
Used Car Roadshow (2005)
Sport Relief (2006)
Playdate (2006)
Glitterball (19 February, March–August 2007)
Nuts TV (14 September 2007 – 2014)
After You've Gone (2008)
My Life as an Animal (2009)
Take Me Out - The Gossip (2011–2013)
This Morning's Hub (2012–2013)

References

External links
Zoe Hardman at Karushi Management.
.

1982 births
Living people
British television presenters